is a Japanese band formed by Kazutoshi Sakurai and Takeshi Kobayashi.

Members 
 Kazutoshi Sakurai (樱井和寿) – vocal, guitar
 Takeshi Kobayashi (小林武史) – keyboards
 Hideo Yamaki (山木秀夫) – drums
 Kawamura Noriyasu (河村智康) – drums
 Mikuzuki Chiharu (美久月千晴) – bass
 Seiji Kameda (亀田诚治) – bass
 TOKIE – bass
 Furukawa Masayoshi (古川昌义) – guitar
 Hirokazu Ogura (小仓博和) – guitar
 Hiroshi Takano (高野寛) – guitar
 Takuo Yamamoto (山本拓夫) – saxophone, flute
 Nishimura Koji (西村浩二) – trumpet
 Fujii Tamao (藤井珠绪) – percussion
 Udai Shika (四家卯大) – cello
 Oki Shoko (冲祥子) – violin
 Kikuchi Mikiyo (菊地干代) – violin
 Tajima Akiko (田岛朗子) – violin
 Ise Mikiko (伊势三木子) – violin
 Nishimori Noriko (西森记子) – violin
 Momoko Ishii (イシイモモコ) – refrain
 Tosaka Ryota (登坂亮太) – refrain

Discography

Albums 
 2004 – Soushi Souai (沿志奏逢)
 2008 – Soushi Souai 2 (沿志奏逢2)
 2010 – Soushi Souai 3 (沿志奏逢3)

Singles 
 2005 – "Umare Kuru Kodomotachi no Tame ni" ("生まれくる子供たちのために")
 2007 – "Harumatsu Ibuki" ("はるまついぶき")
 2009 – "Souai Band Bank Theme ~ ~ no" ("奏逢~ Bank Bandのテーマ~")

References 

Japanese pop rock music groups